Lindsay William Parsons (20 March 1946 – 12 April 2019) was an English professional footballer who played in The Football League for Bristol Rovers and Torquay United.

Playing career
Parsons is from the Barton Hill area of Bristol and played football as a schoolboy for South Gloucester Boys Club and New Cheltenham before signing as an apprentice with Bristol Rovers in 1961 at the age of 15. He signed his first professional contract with Rovers on his eighteenth birthday and made his League debut shortly afterwards. He stayed with Bristol Rovers until 1977, fifteen years after he originally joined them, and made a total of 358 League appearances without scoring any goals. His only other Football League team was Torquay United, for whom he played between 1977 and 1980, and from there he went on to play for a number of non-League teams in the West Country – Taunton Town, Gloucester City, Forest Green Rovers, Yate Town, Hanham Athletic and Frome Town, finally retiring in 1990 at the age of 44.

Non-playing career
Parsons took his first coaching job while still playing non-League football, coaching Bristol Rovers' schoolboy teams between 1983 and 1988. He later gained employment as a coach at Cheltenham Town in 1990, and after Ally Robertson vacated the manager's position in 1992 Parsons was appointed to the position in a caretaker's capacity, and was later given the job permanently.

He later forged a strong working relationship with his former Bristol Rovers teammate Tony Pulis, working with him in various coaching and scouting capacities at Gillingham, Bristol City, Portsmouth, Stoke City, Plymouth Argyle, and at Stoke City again from 2007. In April 2013 Parsons conducted an interview in which he criticised manager Tony Pulis' style of play and stated that a number of players he recommended to Pulis went on to join other Premier League club's. Pulis then stated he has no problems with Parsons views. However, on 3 May 2013 Parsons was fired by Stoke for a "breach of contract".

Career statistics
Source:

References

External links
 

1946 births
2019 deaths
Footballers from Bristol
English footballers
Association football defenders
English Football League players
Bristol Rovers F.C. players
Torquay United F.C. players
Taunton Town F.C. players
Gloucester City A.F.C. players
Forest Green Rovers F.C. players
Yate Town F.C. players
Frome Town F.C. players
Cheltenham Town F.C. managers
Plymouth Argyle F.C. non-playing staff
Cheltenham Town F.C. non-playing staff
Gillingham F.C. non-playing staff
Stoke City F.C. non-playing staff
Hanham Athletic F.C. players
English football managers